is a title for an Emperor of Japan who abdicates the Chrysanthemum Throne in favour of a successor.

As defined in the Taihō Code, although retired, a Daijō Tennō could still exert power. The first such example is the Empress Jitō in the 7th century. A retired emperor sometimes entered the Buddhist monastic community, becoming a cloistered emperor. During late Heian period, cloistered emperors wielded power in a system known as cloistered rule.

List
A total of 64 Japanese emperors have abdicated. A list follows:

{| class="wikitable"
|-
! Name
! Acceded
! Abdicated
! Died
! Successor
! Notes
|-
| Jitō
| 686
| 697
| 703
| Monmu
|Prince Kusabake was named as crown prince to succeed Empress Jitō, but he died aged only 27.  Kusabake's son, Prince Karu, was then named as Jitō's successor.  He eventually would become known as Emperor Monmu. After Jitō abdicated in Monmu's favor, as a retired sovereign, she took the post-reign title daijō-tennō.  After this, her imperial successors who retired took the same title after abdication. Jitō continued to hold power as a cloistered ruler, which became a persistent trend in Japanese politics.  She died 4 years later at the age of 58.
|-
| Genmei
| 707
| 715
| 721
| Genshō
| Gemmei had initially planned to remain on the throne until her grandson might reach maturity.  However, after reigning for 8 years, Gemmei abdicated in favor of Monmu's older sister who then became known as Empress Genshō. 
 715 (Wadō 8): Gemmei resigned as empress in favor of her daughter, who was then known as Empress Genshō.
After abdicating, Gemmei was known as Daijō-tennō; she was only the second woman after Empress Jitō to claim this title.  Gemmei lived in retirement until her death at the age of 61.
|-
| Genshō
| 715
| 724
| 748
| Shōmu
| 
|-
| Shōmu
| 724
| 749
| 756
| Kōken
|
|-
| Kōken
| 749
| 758
| 770 (restored 764)
| Junnin
| Emperor Shōmu abdicated in favor of his daughter Princess Takano in 749, who became Empress Kōken. Empress Kōken abdicated in 758 for her cousin to reign as Emperor Junnin but returned to rule again in 764 as Empress Shōtoku. Her cousin would die a year later in 765.
|-
| Junnin
| 758
| 764 (deposed)
| 765
| Shōtoku (Kōken)
|
|-
| Kōnin
| 770
| 781
| 781
| Kanmu
|
|-
| Heizei
| 806
| 809
| 824
| Saga
|Emperor Heizei was forced to abdicate due to illness in 809 and lived for 14 years as a monk.
|-
| Saga
| 809
| 823
| 842
| Junna
|
|-
| Junna
| 823
| 833
| 840
| Nimmyō
|
|-
| Seiwa
| 858
| 876
| 881
| Yōzei
|
|-
| Yōzei
| 876
| 884 (deposed)
| 949
| Kōkō
|
|-
| Uda
| 887
| 897
| 931
| Daigo
|
|-
| Daigo
| 897
| 930
| 930
| Suzaku
|Emperor Daigo abdicated in favour of his son, as he fell ill, and died a few months later.
|-
| Suzaku
| 930
| 946
| 952
| Murakami
|
|-
| Reizei
| 967
| 969
| 1011
| En'yū
|
 Anna 2 969: Reizei abdicated; and he took the honorific title of Reizei-in Jōkō. His reign lasted for just two years;  and he lived another 44 years in retirement.
 Kankō 8, 24th day of the 10th month (1011):  Daijō-tennō Reizei-in Jōkō died at age 62.
|-
| En'yū
| 969
| 984
| 991
| Kazan
|
|-
| Kazan
| 984
| 986
| 1008
| Ichijō
|
|-
| Ichijō
| 986
| 1011
| 1011
| Sanjō
|
|-
| Sanjō
| 1011
| 1016
| 1017
| Go-Ichijō
|
|-
| Go-Suzaku
| 1036
| 1045
| 1045
| Go-Reizei
|
|-
| Go-Sanjō
| 1068
| 1073
| 1073
| Shirakawa
|
 Kankō 8, on the 13th day of the 6th month (1011): In the 25th year of Emperor Ichijō's reign (一条天皇25年), the emperor abdicated; and the succession (senso) was received by his cousin.   Shortly thereafter, Emperor Sanjō is said to have acceded to the throne (sokui) at age 36.
 Kankō 8, 22nd day of the 6th month (1011): Daijō-tennō Emperor Ichijō died at the age of 32.
|-
| Shirakawa
| 1073
| 1087
| 1129
| Horikawa
|
 Ōtoku 3, on the 26th day of the 11th month (1084): Emperor Shirakawa formally abdicated, and he took the title Daijō Tennō. Shirakawa had personally occupied the throne for 14 years; and for the next 43 years, he would exercise broad powers in what will come to be known as cloistered rule.
Emperor Go-Sanjō had wished for Shirakawa's younger half-brother to succeed him to the throne.  In 1085, this half-brother died of an illness; and Shirakawa's own son, Taruhito became Crown Prince. On the same day that Taruhito was proclaimed as his heir, Shirakawa abdicated; and Taruhito became Emperor Horikawa.  The now-retired Emperor Shirakawa was the first to attempt what became customary cloistered rule.  He exercised power, ruling indirectly from the Shirakawa-in ("White River Mansion/Temple"); nevertheless, nominal sesshō and kampaku offices continued to exist for a long time.
 Kanji 1, in the 5th month (1087):  Daijō Tennō Shirakawa retired himself to Uji.
|-
| Toba
| 1107
| 1123
| 1156
| Sutoku
|
 Eiji  1, in the 3rd month (1141): The former emperor Toba accepted the tonsure and became a Buddhist monk at the age of 39 years.
 Kōji 2, in the 1st month (1143): Cloistered Emperor Toba-in, now known by the title Daijō Hōō, visited his mother.
|-
| Sutoku
| 1123
| 1142
| 1164
| Konoe
|
 Eiji 1, on the 7th day of the 12th month (永治元年; 1141): In the 18th year of Sutoku-tennō'''s reign (崇徳天皇18年), the emperor abdicated; and the succession (senso) was received by a younger brother, the 8th son of former Emperor Toba.  Shortly thereafter, Emperor Konoe is said to have acceded to the throne (sokui).
At that time, Fujiwara-no Tadamichi became sesshō (imperial regent).  The Cloistered Emperor Toba continued to direct all the affairs of government, while the retired Emperor Sutoku had no powers.  This conflict resulted in many controversies during Konoe's reign.
|-
| Go-Shirakawa
| 1155
| 1158
| 1192
| Nijō
|
|-
| Nijō
| 1158
| 1165
| 1165
| Rokujō
|
|-
| Rokujō
| 1165
| 1168
| 1176
| Takakura
|
|-
| Takakura
| 1168
| 1180
| 1181
| Antoku
|
|-
| Go-Toba
| 1183
| 1198
| 1239
| Tsuchimikado
|
|-
| Tsuchimikado
| 1198
| 1210
| 1231
| Juntoku
|
|-
| Juntoku
| 1210
| 1221
| 1242
| Chūkyō
|
|-
| Chūkyō
| 1221
| 1221
| 1234
| Go-Horikawa
|
|-
| Go-Horikawa
| 1221
| 1232
| 1234
| Shijō
|
|-
| Go-Saga
| 1242
| 1246
| 1272
| Go-Fukakusa
|
|-
| Go-Fukakusa
| 1246
| 1259
| 1304
| Kameyama
|
|-
| Kameyama
| 1259
| 1274
| 1305
| Go-Uda
|
|-
| Go-Uda
| 1274
| 1287
| 1324
| Fushimi
|
|-
| Fushimi
| 1287
| 1298
| 1317
| Go-Fushimi
|
|-
| Go-Fushimi
| 1298
| 1301
| 1336
| Go-Nijō
|
|-
| Hanazono
| 1308
| 1318
| 1348
| Go-Daigo
|
|-
| Kōgon
| 1331
| 1333 (deposed)
| 1364
| Go-Daigo
|
|-
| Go-Daigo
| 1318
| 1339
| 1339
| Go-Murakami
|
|-
| Kōmyō (North)
| 1336
| 1348
| 1380
| Sukō (North)
|
|-
| Sukō (North)
| 1348
| 1351
| 1398
| Go-Kōgon (North)
|
|-
| Go-Kōgon (North)
| 1352
| 1371
| 1374
| Go-En'yū (North)
|
|-
| Chōkei (South)
| 1368
| 1383
| 1394
| Go-Kameyama (South)
|
|-
| Go-En'yū (North)
| 1371
| 1382
| 1393
| Go-Komatsu (North)
|
|-
| Go-Kameyama (South)
| 1383
| 1392
| 1424
| Go-Komatsu
|
|-
| Go-Komatsu
| 1382 (N) 1392 (S)
| 1412
| 1433
| Shōkō
|
|-
| Go-Hanazono
| 1428
| 1464
| 1471
| Go-Tsuchimikado
|Emperor Go-Hanazono abdicated in 1464, but not long afterwards, the  broke out; there were no further abdications until 1586, when Emperor Ōgimachi passed the throne to his grandson, Emperor Go-Yōzei. This was due to the disturbed state of the country; and the fact that there was neither a house for an ex-emperor nor money to support him or it.
|-
| Ogimachi
| 1557
| 1586
| 1593
| Go-Yōzei
|
|-
| Go-Yōzei
| 1586
| 1611
| 1617
| Go-Mizunoo
|
|-
| Go-Mizunoo
| 1611
| 1629
| 1680
| Meishō
|
|-
| Meishō
| 1629
| 1643
| 1696
| Go-Kōmyō
|
|-
| Go-Sai
| 1655
| 1663
| 1685
| Reigen
|
|-
| Reigen
| 1663
| 1687
| 1732
| Higashiyama
|
|-
| Higashiyama
| 1687
| 1709
| 1710
| Nakamikado
|
|-
| Nakamikado
| 1709
| 1735
| 1737
| Sakuramachi
|
|-
| Sakuramachi
| 1735
| 1747
| 1750
| Momozono
|
|-
| Momozono
| 1747
| 1762
| 1762
| Go-Sakuramachi
|
|-
| Go-Sakuramachi
| 1762
| 1771
| 1813
| Go-Momozono
| In the history of Japan, Empress Go-Sakuramachi was the last of eight women to take on the role of empress regnant.  The seven female monarchs who reigned before Go-Sakuramachi were Suiko, Kōgyoku (Saimei), Jitō, Genmei, Genshō, Kōken (Shōtoku), and Meishō.
She reigned from 15 September 1762 to 9 January 1771 and died on 24 December 1813.
|-
| Kōkaku
| 1780
| 1817
| 1840
| Ninkō
| Prior to the start of the third millennium the last emperor to become a jōkō was Kōkaku in 1817. He later created an incident called the "Songo incident" (the "respectful title incident").  The jōkō disputed with the Tokugawa Shogunate about his intention to give a title of Abdicated Emperor (Daijō-tennō) to his father, who was Imperial Prince Sukehito.
He died on 11 December 1840.
|-
| Akihito
| 1989
| 2019
| Living
| Naruhito
|
The special law authorizing the abdication of Emperor Akihito on 30 April 2019 provides that the title of Jōkō will be revived for him. As there was no official English translation of the title of Jōkō previously, the Imperial Household Agency decided to define it as "Emperor Emeritus".
|}

Abdication during the Empire of Japan
Emperor Kōmei and the Shōgun
Commodore Matthew C. Perry and his squadron of what the Japanese dubbed "the Black Ships", sailed into the harbor at Edo (now known as Tokyo) in July 1853. Perry sought to open Japan to trade, and warned the Japanese of military consequences if they did not agree. During the crisis brought on by Perry's arrival, the Tokugawa shogunate took, for the first time in at least 250 years, the highly unusual step of consulting with the Imperial Court, and Emperor Kōmei's officials advised that they felt the Americans should be allowed to trade and asked that they be informed in advance of any steps to be taken upon Perry's return. Feeling at a disadvantage against Western powers, the Japanese government allowed trade and submitted to the "Unequal Treaties", giving up tariff authority and the right to try foreigners in its own courts. The shogunate's willingness to consult with the Imperial Court was short-lived: in 1858, word of a treaty arrived with a letter stating that due to shortness of time, it had not been possible to consult. Emperor Kōmei was so incensed that he threatened to abdicate—though even this action would have required the consent of the shōgun.

Meiji constitution on abdication
Emperor Meiji wished to allow a clause codifying the right to abdicate and the formal institution of Daijō Tennō in the new Meiji Constitution. The Prime Minister refused, stating that the Emperor should be above politics, and that in the past, the role of Daijō Tennō had most definitely been employed in the opposite fashion.

Emperor Taishō and regency
In 1921, it became clear that Emperor Yoshihito (later known by his reign name, Taishō, after death) was mentally incapacitated. In pre-modern Japan, he would have been forced to abdicate, but he was left in place and Crown Prince Hirohito (later Emperor Hirohito) was made Sesshō (regent).

See also
 Emeritus
 Taishang Huang – retired Chinese emperor
 Taesangwang – retired Korean ruler
 Retired Emperor

References

Notes

Bibliography
 Brown, Delmer and Ichiro Ishida, eds. (1979). [Jien (1221)], Gukanshō; "The Future and the Past: a translation and study of the 'Gukanshō,' an interpretive history of Japan written in 1219" translated from the Japanese and edited by Delmer M. Brown & Ichirō Ishida. Berkeley: University of California Press.  

  /; OCLC 46731178
 Ponsonby-Fane, Richard A. B. (1956). Kyoto: The Old Capital of Japan, 794-1869. Kyoto: The Ponsonby Memorial Society.
 Titsingh, Isaac, ed. (1834). [Siyun-sai Rin-siyo/Hayashi Gahō (1652)], Nipon o daï itsi ran; ou, Annales des empereurs du Japon.  Paris: Oriental Translation Fund of Great Britain and Ireland.--Click for digitized, full-text copy of this book (in French)
 Varley, H. Paul, ed. (1980). [Kitabatake Chikafusa (1359)], Jinnō Shōtōki ("A Chronicle of Gods and Sovereigns: Jinnō Shōtōki of Kitabatake Chikafusa" translated by H. Paul Varley).'' New York: Columbia University Press.

External links
 National Archives of Japan. Scroll showing procession of Emperor Kōkaku who abdicated in Bunka 14 (1817)

Ancient Japanese institutions
Japanese emperors
Abdication